Rowland Kelechukwu Okereke  (born 13 October 1981), also known mononymously as Kele, is an English singer, songwriter, and musician. He is best known as the lead singer and rhythm guitarist of the indie rock band Bloc Party.

Early life
Okereke was born in Liverpool on 13 October 1981, the son of Nigerian immigrant parents. He is of Igbo descent and was raised Catholic in London. From 2001 to 2003, he studied English literature at King's College London.

Music career

Bloc Party

In 2005, Bloc Party released their first studio album, titled Silent Alarm. The album reached number three in the UK Albums Chart, and propelled the band to fame. Despite this, Okereke continued to study English literature at university. Until the release of Silent Alarm, he had kept his musical activities secret from his parents.

The band released their second album A Weekend in the City on 5 February 2007 in the UK and 6 February in the US. The album debuted at No. 12 on the Billboard 200 with 48,000 copies sold, and reached the No. 2 spot in the UK Albums Chart. For the album, Okereke chose more personal and political subjects for songs. A family friend, Christopher Alaneme, had been murdered in a racist attack, while London bartender David Morley was beaten to death in a possibly homophobic "happy slapping" incident. Okereke has claimed that these events, combined with the 7 July London bombings, "galvanised [his] mindset" and prompted him to make the lyrics "dark, bigger and quite abrasive".

It became available via the UK's iTunes Store a day ahead of schedule, on 4 February. The first single, "The Prayer", was released on 29 January, having been made available on Myspace on 22 November 2006. It reached No. 4 on the UK Singles Chart, still the group's highest placing. The next single, "I Still Remember," was the album's first in the US. The album was produced by Jacknife Lee.

In the build-up to the release of the album, Zane Lowe aired a live set from the BBC studios at Maida Vale featuring a mix of old songs and new ones on his evening radio show on BBC Radio 1 on 30 January 2007. The band also scheduled their first gig with the second album at Reading Hexagon to coincide with the UK release date. On 1 February 2007, A Weekend in the City was made available to listen to for free through the band's official Myspace website.

The third album released by the band Intimacy, was initially only made available for purchase on their website as a download on 21 August 2008. The record was released in compact disc form on 24 October 2008, with Wichita Recordings as the primary label. It peaked at number 8 on the UK Albums Chart and entered the Billboard 200 in the United States at number 18.

In October 2008, Okereke moved to Berlin to seize the city's music oriented spirit.

Okereke made a guest appearance on Tiësto's song "It's Not the Things You Say" on his album Kaleidoscope, released 6 October 2009 and also Martin Solveig's 'Ready 2 Go', after which Bloc Party went on hiatus.

In 2011, Kele Reunited with Bloc Party to record the band's fourth album, Four, which was released in August 2012. Both the album and its lead single -  Octopus, released a month before - peaked in their respective UK charts at number three.

In 2013, the band released an EP called The Nextwave Sessions and went on an indefinite hiatus.

Bloc Party reunited in 2015 with a new line-up. They released their fifth album Hymns on 29 January 2016.

Solo career

Okereke released his first solo album, titled The Boxer, produced by XXXChange, on 21 June 2010, through Wichita / Polydor in the UK and Europe and Glassnote Records for the rest of the world. The album was released under the name Kele, dropping his surname. Okereke explained the album title, saying "as a boxer, you have to rely on nobody else but yourself to achieve what it is you want to achieve. Even though you take hits, you have to keep focus on your priorities and keep going. I thought that was an inspiring image." The first single from the album, "Tenderoni", was released on 14 June 2010.

On 13 September 2011, NME and Wichita Recordings announced that Kele would be releasing a follow up to The Boxer; an EP titled The Hunter.

Kele released the single "Everything You Wanted". It was remixed by South African producers DJ Qness and DJ Mujava, who brought in a fusion of pop along with their traditional South African Kwaito music.

Kele features on Sub Focus' single "Turn It Around" from his second studio album Torus. The song was released on 22 September 2013.

On 23 July 2014, Kele announced his second solo album, entitled Trick, to be released on his own label Lilac Records via Kobalt Label Services on 13 October 2014.

Okereke released his third album Fatherland on 6 October 2017 under his full name (whereas his first two albums were released under the mononym 'Kele').<ref name="Fatherland">{{cite web|url=http://www.nme.com/news/music/bloc-partys-kele-okereke-announces-new-album-fatherhood-shares-track-streets-talkin-2098891|title=Bloc Party's Kele Okereke announces solo album 'Fatherland' and shares new track 'Streets Been Talkin|work=NME|last=Morgan Britton|first=Luke|date=5 July 2017|access-date=7 July 2017}}</ref> Two tracks, "Yemaya" and "Streets Been Talkin'", have been released from the album as of July 2017.

On 19 March 2018, the Bloc Party Facebook page put a picture up indicating they were doing a tour of six shows in Europe performing songs from their first album, Silent Alarm.

In January 2019, "Leave to Remain", a new musical written by Okereke and Matt Jones debuted in London. Announced in September 2018, the musical about an interracial gay couple was preceded by the single "Not the Drugs Talking" which showed a move back towards beats following the more acoustic Fatherland. Telling a love story through the Prism of Brexit, the new show is accompanied by a tie-in album of new songs. Speaking about the subject matter and his feelings on the UK in 2019, Okereke claimed that "It’s not a time that I’ve been proud to be British. It’s an ugly time. The opportunity to tell a story about people from different cultures coming together and finding love in the shadow of that is an important thing to stand up for."

In November 2019, saw the release of Kele's fourth album, 2042. The title is a reference to the year that census data predicts ethnic minorities will become the majority in the United States. Much of the album tackles political themes such as the Windrush scandal, Grenfell Tower fire and Colin Kaepernick's national anthem protest. Musically, Kele fuses funk with experimental electro, glitchy guitars and West African beats, according to NME. The album was released under the name Kele, again dropping his surname.

In May 2021, Okereke released his fifth studio album entitled The Waves Pt. 1.

Personal life
In March 2010, Okereke came out as gay in a BUTT magazine article. He then gave an interview and appeared on the June 2010 cover of Attitude magazine. He had previously been reluctant to discuss his sexuality, though he had compared himself to bisexual musicians Brian Molko and David Bowie. He has also compared himself to Morrissey, whose sexuality remains speculated. Additionally, he has discussed the homoerotic story behind the Bloc Party song "I Still Remember" and its semi-autobiographical nature. In June 2010, he was named as the "Sexiest Out Gay Male Artist" by music website LP33 in its annual survey.

In 2010, Okereke launched his personal website at iamkele.com.

In a 2014, interview with NBHAP, Okereke told that he is "excited about the future". He said, "There is a lot going on, a lot of upheaval but with change comes the opportunity for rebirth, which is my favourite kind of experience."

 Oasis feud 
Okereke responded critically to comments made by Liam and Noel Gallagher of Oasis in early 2007. Liam called Bloc Party "a band off of University Challenge''" while Noel dismissed them as "indie shit". Okereke replied, "I think Oasis are the most overrated and pernicious band of all time. They had a totally negative and dangerous impact upon the state of British music. They have made stupidity hip. They claim to be inspired by the Beatles but, and this saddens me, they have failed to grasp that the Beatles were about constant change and evolution. Oasis are repetitive Luddites." When Oasis cancelled their headlining set at the Rock-en-Seine festival in August 2009, which would lead to the band's demise, Okereke and the band's tour manager Peter Hill announced to the crowd that Oasis had cancelled their slot during Bloc Party's own set and sarcastically declared the breakup to be a shame. He then announced to the crowd, "So I guess by default, we are headlining." After bandmate Russell Lissack played a brief part of the Oasis song "Supersonic", Okereke mockingly dedicated the Bloc Party track "Mercury" to the Oasis fans "who really, really wanted to see those inbred twins".

Discography

Solo Albums

Soundtrack albums

EPs

Singles

Featured singles
"Believe" with The Chemical Brothers (2005)
"It's Not The Things You Say" with Tiësto (2009)
"Ready 2 Go" with Martin Solveig (2011)
"Step Up" with Hercules & Love Affair (2011)
"What Did I Do?" with Sander van Doorn featuring Lucy Taylor (2011)
"Turn It Around" with Sub Focus (2013)
"Let Go" with RAC (2013)
"Faith" with V V Brown (2014)
"The One" with Sable (2014)
"So They Say" with Claptone (2018)
"Won't Give Up" with Ejeca (2020)

Cultural influence 
Online code school Bloc offers an optional API programming project called "Kele", named after Kele Okereke.

References

External links

 

1981 births
Living people
Black British rock musicians
21st-century Black British male singers
Bloc Party members
British indie rock musicians
English people of Igbo descent
English male guitarists
English rock guitarists
English rock singers
English male singer-songwriters
English gay musicians
English LGBT singers
English LGBT songwriters
Musicians from Liverpool
Singers from London
Rhythm guitarists
Gay singers
Gay songwriters
Wichita Recordings artists
Atomic Bomb! Band members
LGBT Black British people
20th-century English LGBT people